Preston Remington (1897–1958) was an American art historian who served as a curator at the Metropolitan Museum of Art between 1923 and 1958.

Career
After graduating from Harvard University, Preston Remington (1897–1958) joined The Metropolitan Museum of Art’s Department of Decorative Arts in 1923 as an assistant under curator Joseph Breck. He served for the remainder of his career as assistant curator (1924–1928), associate curator (1929–1933), curator in the newly formed Department of Renaissance and Modern Art (1934–1950) and its successor Department of Renaissance Art (1950–1957), and research curator there from 1957 to 1958. After Breck's death in 1933, the department was divided into the three separate departments, Medieval art (under James J. Rorimer), Renaissance and Post-Renaissance art (under Remington), and American Art (under Joseph Downs). He later advanced to the Vice-Directorship of the Department of Renaissance and Post-Renaissance Art. Remington chaired the Museum's Committee on Architectural Rearrangement from 1941 to 1943. Composed of Museum curators and administrators, the Committee was tasked with surveying individual departments' existing storage, display, and conservation spaces to assist in future planning for Museum expansion. In the 1950s, Remington worked on the installation of the period rooms of the Museum, opened in 1954. Throughout his career, he published extensively in his Museum's journals on objects in its collection.

Remington was named Vice Director of the Museum in 1949, which combined major administrative responsibilities with a curatorial role, he retired from that position due to ill health in 1955. He continued to work on a catalogue of the Museum’s French silver, which had been bequeathed in large part by Catherine D. Wentworth during his tenure as curator. Remington also maintained relationships with major donors to the museum such as Jules Bache, Susan Dwight Bliss, Mr. and Mrs. Edward Harkness, and George Dupont Pratt. After Remington's death on April 7, 1958, Director James Rorimer noted that “The major accomplishment during his later years of service to the Museum was the installation of the collections of post-renaissance [sic] decorative arts in the new galleries,” including the reconstruction of period rooms that opened in November 1954.

Selected publications
"A Louis XVI Bed." Bulletin of the Metropolitan Museum of Art, 19, no. 1 (January 1924), pp. 6–8.
"An Ebony Cabinet of the Seventeenth Century." Bulletin of the Metropolitan Museum of Art, 26, no. 10, (October 1931), pp. 232–36.
"Alpheus and Arethusa: A Marble Group by Battista Lorenzi." The Metropolitan Museum of Art Bulletin 35, no. 3 (March 1940), pp. 61–65 and ill. p. 49 (front cover).
Sculptures by Antoine Lous Barye: A Picture Book. The Metropolitan Museum of Art. New York, 1940.
"A Room from the Hotel de Tesse." The Metropolitan Museum of Art Bulletin, n.s., 1, no. 6 (February 1943), pp. 189–95.
"A Monument Honoring the Invention of the Balloon." The Metropolitan Museum of Art Bulletin, n.s, 2, no. 8 (April 1944), pp. 241–48.
"The Galleries of European Decorative Art & Period Rooms: Chiefly XVII & XVIII Century." The Metropolitan Museum of Art Bulletin, n.s., 13, no. 3 (November 1954), pp. 65–71.

References

See also
Gross, Michael. Rogues' Gallery: the Secret History of the Moguls and the Money that Made the Metropolitan Museum. New York: Broadway Books, 2009, pp. 250.

People associated with the Metropolitan Museum of Art
Harvard University alumni
1958 deaths
1897 births